"Aloha ʻOe" ("Farewell to Thee") is a Hawaiian folk song written circa 1878 by Liliʻuokalani, who was then Princess of the Hawaiian Kingdom. It is her most famous song and is a common cultural symbol for Hawaii.

Background
The story of the origin of the song has several variations.  They all have in common that the song was inspired by a notable farewell embrace given by Colonel James Harbottle Boyd during a horseback trip taken by Princess Liliʻuokalani in 1877 or 1878 to the Boyd ranch in Maunawili on the windward side of Oʻahu, and that the members of the party hummed the tune on the way back to Honolulu.  Different versions tell of alternate recipients of the embrace—either Liliʻuokalani's sister Princess Likelike Cleghorn or a young lady at the ranch. According to the most familiar version of the story:
This tender farewell set Liliʻuokalani to thinking, and she began humming to herself on the homeward trip. Overhearing, Charles Wilson observed, "That sounds like The Lone Rock by the Sea," a comment with which Liliʻuokalani is said to have agreed. When the party paused to rest in an orange grove on the Honolulu side of the Pali, the others joined in the hummings, and the song was completed later at Washington Place.

The Hawaiʻi State Archives preserves a hand-written manuscript by Liliʻuokalani, dated 1878, with the score of the song, the lyrics, Liliʻuokalani's English translation, and her note evidently added later: "Composed at Maunawili 1878. Played by the Royal Hawaiian Band in San Francisco August 1883 and became very popular."

The first known recording of the song was released by Berliner Gramophone in 1898. A catalogue issued by Columbia Records in 1901 mentioned two wax cylinders labeled "Vocal Solos in Hawaiian", containing some of the earlier recordings of "Aloha ʻOe" and "Kuʻu Pua I Paoakalani". However, it is uncertain if this was recorded in Hawaii or if the performer was Hawaiian and the cylinders are now lost. Columbia Records later recorded a duet of the song by Nani Alapai and Henry N. Clark in 1911.
A 1913 score can be seen at the Levy Sheet Music Collection.

Lyrics

Musicology
Parts of "Aloha 'Oe" resemble the song "The Lone Rock by the Sea" and the chorus of George Frederick Root's 1854 song "There's Music in the Air".  "The Lone Rock by the Sea" mentioned by Charles Wilson, was "The Rock Beside the Sea" published by Charles Crozat Converse in 1857, and itself derives from a Croatian/Serbian folk song, "Sedi Mara na kamen studencu" (Mary is Sitting on a Stone Well). The "Aloha Oe" Chorus melody was also used as the counterpoint to the chorus of the jazz song, Hula Lou and also could be a counterpoint to Woody Guthrie's folk song, "This Land Is Your Land".

Notable recordings
1911 Nani Alapai and Henry N. Clark – recording for Columbia Records
1924 Frank Ferera – this reached the charts of the day.
1936 Bing Crosby – recorded July 23, 1936 with Dick Mcintyre and His Harmony Hawaiians. 
1946 Les Paul and His Trio – recorded March 29, 1946 for Decca Records (catalog No.23685).
1961 Elvis Presley - recorded March 21–23, 1961 for RCA Records as the soundtrack for the film Blue Hawaii

Film appearances
1936 Waikiki Wedding – sung by chorus
1937 Hawaiian Holiday
1938 Hawaii Calls
1953 From Here to Eternity
1961 Blue Hawaii – sung by Elvis Presley November 22, 1962
1989 The Karate Kid Part III — hummed by Daniel while changing
2002 Lilo & Stitch – the song is sung briefly by the character Nani Pelekai (voiced by Tia Carrere) as a means to say goodbye to her sister Lilo, from whom she was preparing to be separated the following day. It is sung again in its franchise's fourth film Leroy & Stitch (2006) by Lilo (Daveigh Chase), Stitch (Chris Sanders), and Reuben (Rob Paulsen) to shut down the Leroy clones. Carrere's performance of the song, with added backing instrumentation, also appears on the soundtrack of Lilo & Stitch 2: Stitch Has a Glitch (2005).
2005 Aloha, Scooby-Doo! – Sung by the Wikki Tikki in the film's climax.
2016 Train to Busan – partially sung by one of the main characters, and is also instrumental in the film's conclusion.

In popular culture

An instrumental rendition performed by George Kulokahai, is featured in many episodes of SpongeBob SquarePants as background music.

The song has appeared in several instances throughout Disney's Lilo & Stitch franchise. In Lilo & Stitch (2002), Nani sings it to Lilo as a farewell the night before they were to be separated. In the Lilo & Stitch: The Series episode "Spooky" (2003), Lilo reveals to Stitch that she sings the song to herself as a coping mechanism, which leads to Stitch doing so for himself later in the same episode, to Lilo's approval. In Leroy & Stitch (2006), Jumba Jookiba uses Elvis Presley's cover of the song during the creation of Leroy to secretly program a fail-safe within him; this is exploited during the climax in Stitch (dressed up as Presley), Lilo, and Reuben (along with several of the Experiments near the end) play an upbeat rock version during the finale to shut Leroy and his clones down.

In the episode "Cruise Cat" of Tom and Jerry (1952), a guitar version of this song plays in the background.

In the first episode of the 1963 Hanna-Barbera cartoon Top Cat entitled "Hawaii, Here We Come", at the start of the episode, Benny the Ball sings the song, after winning a free trip to Hawaii, sometime later Officer Dibble also sings the song. They both however replace some of the lyrics with English ones.

"Aloha 'Oe" appeared in the scores of many of Warner Bros.' classic Looney Tunes and Merrie Melodies cartoons, as composer Carl Stalling's stock musical cue for Hawaii-themed gags. Usually instrumental, but Bugs Bunny actually sings one line of the refrain at the very end of Case of the Missing Hare. In the 1953 cartoon short, Duck Amuck part of it is briefly sung by Daffy Duck when the scenery is changed to a Hawaiian setting, courtesy of a sadistic mystery animator and again in A Squeak in the Deep. In the 1958 Oscar-winning short Knighty Knight Bugs, the cartoon ends with an enchanted sword performing an instrumental version of the song (played by a musical saw).

The chorus of the song serves as the intro for Spike Jones' interpretation of "Hawaiian War Chant". ("As the sun pulls away from the shore, and our boat sinks slowly in the west...")

The song also appeared in the Popeye the Sailor short, Alona on the Sarong Seas, where it was played in the beginning of the short, and after Popeye eats his spinach.

In the Japanese anime Space Dandy (created in 2014), the eponymous main character is captain of a spaceship called the Aloha Oe.

The Jack London short story Aloha Oe features the chorus of the song.

When Jiang Zemin, then-Chinese President and the General Secretary of the Communist Party of China, arrived at Hawaii at the beginning of his state visit to U.S. in October 1997, he played "Aloha ‘Oe" with a Hawaiian lap steel guitar and invited then Hawaiian First Lady Vicky Cayetano to sing the song at a dinner with the presence of Governor Ben Cayetano. Jiang recounted that he used to frequently play this song when he was in college in 1940s.

It is also used in the final scene of Train to Busan.

The castaways sing the song as a good luck charm to a robot toward the end of the Gilligan's Island episode "Gilligan's Living Doll", as it is about to walk from the island underwater all the way to Hawaii.

The song is played in the eighth episode of the 8th season of The Simpsons, "Hurricane Neddy", when Ned Flanders drives away to the psychiatric hospital.

The song appeared in episode 4 of the HBO miniseries The White Lotus. 

The song was heard in 2007 film Alvin and the Chipmunks when Alvin was humming and using the towel rack as a Hula hoop.

See also
 Music of Hawaii
List of compositions and works by Liliʻuokalani

Notes

References

External links

1877 songs
Compositions by Liliuokalani
Dorothy Lamour songs
Andy Williams songs
Hawaiian songs
Symbols of Hawaii
Goombay Dance Band songs
1877 in Hawaii
Songs about Hawaii
Elvis Presley songs
Macaronic songs
Songs about parting